Mimoides xynias is a species of butterfly in the family Papilionidae. It is found in the Neotropical realm.

Subspecies
M. x. xynias Peru, Bolivia
M. x. trapeza (Rothschild & Jordan, 1906) Ecuador

Description from Seitz

P. xynias Hew. (13 c). Forewing with large pale green area at the hindmargin; hindwing acutely dentate, with short, narrow tail and a few red discal spots posteriorly. Beneath the forewing has a white, very faintly- green hindmarginal spot, which is smaller than the spot on the upper surface. No scent-scales. Female not known. — Eastern slopes of the Andes of Bolivia and Peru.
P. trapeza R. & J. (13 c). Forewing narrower in the middle than in harmodius, the hindmargin
shorter, a white spot at the hindmargin, not extending to the 2. median; hindwing triangular, sharply dentate, with 2 to 4- red spots from the hindmargin forwards, the posterior spot the largest. Beneath the white hindmarginal spot of the forewing is longer than in all the forms of harmodius. Female unknown. — East Ecuador and North-East Peru

References

External links

 

pausanias
Butterflies described in 1875
Papilionidae of South America
Taxa named by William Chapman Hewitson